The 2010 Mountain West Conference men's basketball tournament was played at the Thomas & Mack Center in Las Vegas, Nevada from March 10–13, 2010. The tournament is sponsored by Conoco. The first-round game and all four quarterfinals were broadcast live on the MountainWest Sports Network. The semifinals was broadcast on CBS College Sports Network, and the championship game on Versus. The winner of the tournament receives an automatic bid to the NCAA tournament.

San Diego State, the fourth seed, defeated University of Nevada, Las Vegas (UNLV), the third seed, to claim the 2010 Mountain West Conference men's basketball tournament championship.

Tournament bracket

References

External links

Tournament
Mountain West Conference men's basketball tournament
Mountain West Conference men's basketball tournament
Mountain West Conference men's basketball tournament